Gallup ; Zuni: Kalabwaki) is a city in McKinley County, New Mexico, United States, with a population of 21,899 as of the 2020 census. A substantial percentage of its population is Native American, with residents from the Navajo, Hopi, and Zuni tribes. Gallup is the county seat of McKinley County and the most populous city between Flagstaff and Albuquerque, along historic U.S. Route 66.

The city was founded in 1881 as a railhead for the Atlantic and Pacific Railroad, and named after David Gallup, a paymaster for the railroad. It is on the Trails of the Ancients Byway, one of the designated New Mexico Scenic Byways. Because of the nearby rugged terrain, it was a popular location in the 1940s and 1950s for Hollywood Westerns.

History
Gallup was founded in 1881 as a railhead for the Atlantic and Pacific Railroad. The city was named after David Gallup, a paymaster for the Atlantic and Pacific Railroad. 
During World War II, the city fought successfully to prevent 800 Japanese American residents from being placed in wartime internment, 
the only New Mexico city to do so.

Gallup is known as the "Heart of Indian Country" or the "Heart of Indians" because it is on the edge of the Navajo reservation and is home to members of many other tribes, as well.

Culture 

U.S. Route 66 passed through Gallup, and the town's name is mentioned in the lyrics of the song "(Get Your Kicks on) Route 66" ("You'll see Amarillo and Gallup, New Mexico"). In 2003, the U.S. and New Mexico Departments of Transportation renumbered US Highway 666, the city's other major highway, as Route 491. Former Governor Bill Richardson pushed for (and got) the number changed because "666" is associated with Satan and Devil worship, thus it was considered "cursed" or a "Beast" to some locals. The situation was exacerbated by the high death toll on the highway, which was largely a result of high rates of drivers under the influence of alcohol or drugs, and budget shortfalls among both the New Mexico Department of Transportation and state and local law-enforcement agencies.

Gallup has a modestly lively night time culture downtown, Indian dances during summertime nights, art crawls, and small museums, including a Navajo code talk museum.
Gallup commissioned a number of murals highlighting local culture, and contributions dot downtown.

Being the largest city between Flagstaff and Albuquerque, Gallup claims many notable buildings, places, events, and people.
The historic El Rancho Hotel & Motel has hosted a numerous array of movie stars, including John Wayne, Ronald Reagan, Humphrey Bogart, Spencer Tracy, Katharine Hepburn, Joan Crawford, Kirk Douglas, Doris Day, Gregory Peck, and Burt Lancaster. The rugged terrain surrounding Gallup was popular with Hollywood filmmakers during the 1940s and '50s for the on-location shooting of Westerns. Actors and film crews would stay at that hotel during filming. Films made in Gallup include Billy the Kid (1930), Pursued (1947), The Sea of Grass (1947), Four Faces West (1948), Only the Valiant (1951), Ace in the Hole (1951), Escape from Fort Bravo (1953), A Distant Trumpet (1964), and The Hallelujah Trail (1965). Other movies shot here are Redskin (1928), and Superman (1978).

Gallup is sometimes called the "Indian Capital of the World", for its location in the heart of Native American lands, and the presence of Navajo, Zuni, Hopi, and other tribes. Well over a third of the city's population has Native American roots. Gallup's nickname references the huge impact of the Native American cultures found in and around the city.

In 2013, Gallup was named by Rand McNally as the "Most Patriotic Small Town in America 2013".

Geography
Gallup is located at  (35.5280783, −108.7425843).

Demographics 

As of the 2000 census, 20,209 people, 6,810 households, and 4,869 families were residing in the city. The population density was 1,513.7 people per square mile (584.5/km2). There were 7,349 housing units at an average density of 550.5 per square mile (212.5/km2). The racial makeup of the city was 43.8% Native American, 35.2% White,  2.0% Asian, 1.2% African American, 12.1% from other races]], and 5.8% from two or more races. About 31.7% of the population was Hispanic or Latino of any race,

Of the 6,810 households, 41.1% had children under 18 living with them, 45.3% were married couples living together, 19.8% had a female householder with no husband present, and 28.5% were not families. About 23.8% of all households were made up of individuals, and 6.8% had someone living alone who was 65 or older. The average household size was 2.85, and the average family size was 3.39.

In the city, the age distribution was 32.7% under 18, 9.3% from 18 to 24, 28.8% from 25 to 44, 20.3% from 45 to 64, and 8.9% who were 65 or older. The median age was 31 years. For every 100 females, there were 91.0 males. For every 100 females 18 and over, there were 86.2 males.

It has close proximity to Native American reservations, and historic lack of economic development in addition to many mine closures in the last century. As a result of these closures, a large proportion of Gallup's households is low-income. The median income for a household in the city was $34,868, and the median income for a family was $39,197. Males had a median income of $33,380 versus $24,441 for females. The per capita income for the city was $15,789. About 16.6% of families and 20.8% of the population were below the poverty line, including 26.8% of those under age 18 and 16.8% of those age 65 or over.

Crime
Crime is a serious problem in Gallup. In 2012, violent crime was nearly five times the national average. As a result, the city has the highest violent crime rate in New Mexico. According to an article published in November 2014, "Gallup saw 463 violent crimes last year including murder, rape, robbery, and aggravated assault. That’s an 11% increase from the year before and two times the rate of Albuquerque, the state’s largest city."

Parade ramming 
On August 4, 2022, an SUV, driven by an intoxicated individual, drove through a parade crowd during the city's 100th annual Intertribal Celebration, leaving 15 injured, including two police officers and several children.

Education
Gallup-McKinley County Public Schools is the local school district.

Previously, the Bureau of Indian Affairs (BIA) operated Manuelito Hall in Gallup, a dormitory that housed Native American students attending Gallup-McKinley schools. In 1973, it had about 300 students. That year, the BIA closed Manuelito Hall, planning to move students to various boarding schools.

Transportation
Airport
 Gallup Municipal Airport is a public airport with primarily private and charter flights. The Aviation Identifier for the airport is GUP.

Major highways
 Interstate 40
 U.S. Route 491

Railroad
 Rail freight service passes through Gallup on the Southern Transcon of the BNSF Railroad.
 Amtrak's Southwest Chief provides passenger service at the Gallup train station.

Bus

 The Navajo Transit System provides regional bus services throughout the Navajo Nation. Gallup is served by Route 05 to Fort Defiance, Arizona, and Route 06 to Crystal, New Mexico.
The Gallup Express provides local service to Gallup and connection to Zuni.
A:shiwi Transit connects Zuni Pueblo and Black Rock with Gallup.
Greyhound has a local stop on West Highway 66.

Climate 
Gallup, like most of the interior Mountain West, has a cool semiarid climate (Köppen BSk). Despite the large diurnal temperature range, most rain falls in the summer from afternoon thunderstorms.

Notable people

 Glenn L. Emmons, former Gallup banker (1929) and the commissioner of the BIA (1953–1961)
 Mike Everitt, former Major League Baseball umpire
 Sydney Freeland, filmmaker
 Chon Gallegos, former NFL quarterback for the Oakland Raiders
 Carl Nelson Gorman (Kin-Ya-Onny-Beyeh), Navajo code talker during World War II, visual artist, painter, illustrator, and professor; lived in Gallup from 1973 until 1998.
Arthur T. Hannett, mayor of Gallup, and seventh governor of New Mexico
 Vernon Kerr, scientist and member of the New Mexico House of Representatives
 Hiroshi H. Miyamura, Medal of Honor recipient in the U.S. Army, awarded for his actions during the Korean War
 Carolyn S. Shoemaker, astronomer and co-discoverer of Comet Shoemaker-Levy 9
 Sunshine Sykes, lawyer and jurist
  Anthonette Cayedito, kidnap victim, missing child

Gallery

See also
 Roman Catholic Diocese of Gallup
 USS Gallup, name of three ships in the United States Navy, the later two named for the city of Gallup

References

External links

 Official city website
 

 
1881 establishments in New Mexico Territory
Cities in McKinley County, New Mexico
Cities in New Mexico
County seats in New Mexico
Micropolitan areas of New Mexico
Populated places established in 1881